Yaroslav Garrievich Sverdlov (born 11 June 1968) is Belarusian former footballer who played as a midfielder.

Career
In 1993, Svedlov signed for Belarusian top flight side Dnepr, where he made 182 league appearances and scored 3 goals, helping them win their only league title. Before the 2000 season, he signed for Belshina in the Belarusian top flight, helping them win their only league title. Before the 2002 season, Svedlov signed for Belarusian second tier club Torpedo (Mogilev).

After retirement he left professional football, but continues playing for veteran teams.

References

External links
 

1968 births
Living people
Association football midfielders
Belarusian First League players
Belarusian footballers
Belarusian Premier League players
FC Belshina Bobruisk players
FC Dnepr Mogilev players
FC Torpedo Mogilev players
FC Transmash Mogilev players
Soviet Second League players